Visborg (Wisborg) refers to a fortress in the town of Visby on the Swedish island of Gotland. Successive fortresses were built in Visby (borg means fortress or castle), though Visborg is usually in reference to the castle built here by King Eric of Denmark, Norway, and Sweden.

History 
Duke Eric (son of King Magnus III of Sweden) appears to be the first to construct a fortress in the southwest corner of Visby in 1310 as part of a struggle between his brothers for control over the kingdoms of Sweden and Norway as well as Danish claims on Gotland; this brings Gotland under Norwegian control. King Magnus IV, son of Duke Eric, then ruled Norway and Sweden. In 1356, King Magnus gave control of Norway to his son, King Haakon VI Magnusson, though Magnus still remains as King of Sweden.

In July 1361, Danish forces under King Valdemar Atterdag landed in Gotland. On 27 July, Visby was seized and at least 2,000 peasants were killed.

In 1362, Swedish nobles led a revolt and declared Haakon as King of Sweden.

The following year is defining for the future of Scandinavia. In 1363 l, Haakon and Magnus reconcile and Haakon marries Margaret (Queen Margaret I of Denmark), the daughter of Valdemar; father and son agree to share the throne of Sweden. The nobles again rise up and offer the crown to Magnus's nephew Duke Albert of Mecklenburg.

In 1375,  King Valdemar of Denmark dies and Margaret ensures that her and Haakon's infant son, Olaf (Olav) is named heir to the throne. Only five years later, in 1380 her husband Haakon, King of Norway, dies making Olaf heir apparent to both thrones of Norway and Denmark upon his becoming of age; until that time his mother acts as Queen Regent to both nations. However, in 1387 
Olaf dies, and Margaret becomes ruler of Denmark and Norway.

In 1388, King Albert is driven from Sweden for Margaret to assume the throne. After a failed counter-assault by Albert in 1389, Albert and his son are taken prisoner. Margaret is named ruler of Sweden which angers the Mecklenburg Dukes. This marks the formation of the Kalmar Union that unifies the three crowns.

In an attempt to destabilize Denmark, the Mecklenburg's hired the Victual Brothers, pirates, to disrupt trade in 1392. They used Visby on Gotland as their fortress from which they were a costly menace to all members of the Hanseatic League. In 1395, after a treaty with the Mecklenburg's, Albert is released with the understanding that he will turn Stockholm over to Margaret in three years.

Margaret and Albert give Gotland to the Teutonic Order, with the pledge that the order will remove the Victual Brothers and their fortress in Visby. Konrad von Jungingen, the Grand Master of the Order, takes the Island in 1398 and destroys Visby.

In 1397, Margaret passes rule of Norway, Sweden, and Denmark to her grandnephew Eric of Pomerania. In 1408 the Teutonic Knights sell Visby to Erik. Three years later he begins construction of Visborg Castle, the most famous of the Visborg fortresses.
In 1430, the Kalmar Union begins to fall apart. King Eric initiates a number of policies that upset nobles in all three of his kingdoms. Hostilities between the king and the nobles escalate until 1439 when Eric is deposed by Karl Knutsson Bonde (later king Charles VIII of Sweden) in Sweden and by King Christopher III, Erik's nephew, in Denmark; Eric was offered the throne of Norway alone, but declined. In response he took up permanent residence in Visborg Castle, but he never relinquished his claim to the throne. Though by 1440, he had no power outside of Gotland.

Christopher reigned as sole monarch of the Kalmar Union until he died in 1448 without an heir. Swedish nobles took the opportunity to crown Karl Knuttsson as King of Sweden and Norway; and Christian I became King of Denmark. This began a long period of warfare between the kings of Denmark and Sweden over who would once again rule over the three kingdoms of the Kalmar Union. With tensions rising, Gotland became an immediate point of conflict. In 1448, Charles launched an invasion of the island and was able to secure all but Visby because of the fortifications at Visborg, still inhabited by the deposed King Eric. Eric made a deal with Christian I in 1448, because they were family, in which he agreed to cede Gotland to the Danes and renounce his claims to the throne in return for safe passage to Pomerania. Christian agreed and in 1449, a Danish army reinforced the defenses of Visborg by sneaking in under cover of darkness. As the Danes moved in the Swedes evacuated the island. As promised Eric was given safe passage to Pomerania where he ruled the Duchy of Stolp as Eric I until his death in 1459.

Despite numerous challenges, Denmark retained continuous rule of the island until a peace treaty signed in 1645 granted it to Sweden for 30 years. Denmark gained it back in 1676, but three years later Denmark signed another peace treaty with Sweden in which they agreed to return Gotland. As the Danish soldiers were leaving Visby that year, they blew up the fortress of Visborg. Some fragments of its structure still can be seen overlooking the harbor of Visby.

After the fortress 

Prince Oscar of Sweden, Duke of Gotland and second in line to the Swedish throne, married without his father's permission, thereby relinquishing his right to succession and royal titles. On 2 February 1892 he was made the first Count of Wisborg by his mother's (Sophia of Nassau) brother Adolphe, Grand Duke of Luxembourg with reference to the old fortress of his former dukedom. Including Oscar there have been four such counts created, three of them Oscar's grandnephews in the 20th century, all former Swedish princes heirs who lost their Swedish titles for marrying without the King of Sweden's consent.

Trivia 
Some versions of F. W. Murnau's 1922 classic horror film Nosferatu take place in Bremen, Germany. In fact the original work of Murnau was supposed to be set in Wisborg (the better restorations of the film use Wisborg, some of the worst use Bremen and Bram Stoker's names for the characters). The discrepancy results from the work being pieced together from various versions after translation in various countries. The work was filmed in Delft, the Netherlands and Slovakia, so it isn't clear why Bremen was chosen by the later inter-title makers – Bremen doesn't have a beach to explain some of the scenes in Nosferatu. That being said, Murnau's selection of Wisborg is unexplained as well. It is unclear whether he was using Wisborg since no city actually exists with the name or if he understood the relation to Visborg and the town name holds a deeper significance.

See also 
Count of Wisborg
Eric of Pomerania
Gotland
Magnus IV of Sweden
Margaret I of Denmark
Visby

External links
Chronology of Swedish History, 1300–1399, 1400–1499, 1500–1599, 1600–1699 by Ken Polsson 
History of Sweden, 1397–1448 by Alexander Ganse
Visby Attractions
History of Sweden, 1448–1523 by Alexander Ganse

Ruined castles in Sweden
Visby
Buildings and structures in Gotland County